WMEX may refer to:

 WMEX (AM), a radio station (1510 AM) licensed to serve Quincy, Massachusetts, United States, the original station to use the call sign, from 1934 to 1978 and since November 2014
 WMEX-LP, a radio station (105.9 FM) licensed to serve Rochester, New Hampshire, United States
 WMVY, a radio station (88.7 FM) licensed to serve Edgartown, Massachusetts, which used the call sign WMEX in May 2014
 WNHI, a radio station (106.5 FM) licensed to serve Farmington, New Hampshire, which used the call sign WMEX from February 2001 to June 2008
 WQOM, a radio station (1060 AM) licensed to serve Natick, Massachusetts, which used the call sign WMEX from October 1999 to January 2001
 WFYL, a radio station (1180 AM) licensed to serve King of Prussia, Pennsylvania, United States, which used the call sign WMEX from February 1999 to September 1999
 WCLX, a radio station (102.9 FM) licensed to serve Westport, New York, United States, which used the call sign WMEX from September 1996 to February 1999
 WWDJ, a radio station (1150 AM) licensed to serve Boston, Massachusetts, which used the call sign WMEX from February 1985 to August 1996
 WMJK, a radio station (100.9 FM) licensed to serve Clyde, Ohio, United States, which used the call sign WMEX until February 1985